Drillia rosacea, common name the rose turrid, is a species of sea snail, a marine gastropod mollusk in the family Drilliidae.

Description
The shell grows to a length of 30 mm.

The shell is rose-colored throughout. It is longitudinally closely ribbed, with fine revolving striae, concave and smooth above the periphery. The siphonal canal is very short. The anal sinus is broad and large.

Distribution
This species occurs in the demersal zone of the Atlantic Ocean off Guinea, Ivory Coast and Gabon

References

 Bernard, P.A. (Ed.) (1984). Coquillages du Gabon [Shells of Gabon]. Pierre A. Bernard: Libreville, Gabon. 140, 75 plates pp. 
  Tucker, J.K. 2004 Catalog of recent and fossil turrids (Mollusca: Gastropoda). Zootaxa 682:1–1295

External links
 

rosacea
Gastropods described in 1845